Jean-Luc Thomas (born 6 February 1963) is a French cross-country skier. He competed in the men's 15 kilometre classical event at the 1988 Winter Olympics.

References

1963 births
Living people
French male cross-country skiers
Olympic cross-country skiers of France
Cross-country skiers at the 1988 Winter Olympics
Place of birth missing (living people)